Robert MacGregor Dawson  (1895–1958) was a Canadian political scientist who served as Professor of Political Economy at the University of Toronto. He is best known as coauthor with Norman Ward of the 1947 textbook The Government of Canada.

Born on 1 March 1895 in Bridgewater, Nova Scotia, Dawson received a Bachelor of Arts degree in 1915 and a master's degree in 1916 from Dalhousie University. During that time, he served locally with the 1st "Halifax" Regiment, Royal Canadian Garrison Artillery. He received a Master of Arts degree from Harvard University in 1917 and Master of Science and Doctor of Science degrees in economics from the University of London (where he studied at the London School of Economics) in 1921 and 1922 respectively.

In 1921, he started teaching at Dalhousie University before leaving to teach at the Carnegie Institute of Technology and Rutgers University. In 1928, he returned to Canada as head of the political science department at the University of Saskatchewan. In 1937, he started teaching at the University of Toronto. He left in 1951 to write a biography of Prime Minister of Canada William Lyon Mackenzie King. He finished the first volume before his death in Bridgewater NS, in 1958.

He was married to Sarah Ada Foster (1896–1969). They had two sons: Robert MacGregor Dawson (1927–2000; Carnegie Professor of English, University of King's College (Dalhousie University), Halifax, NS) and William Foster Dawson (1930–2011; Professor Emeritus of Political Science, University of Western Ontario, London, ON). Dawson died on 16 July 1958.

In 1975, he was named a Person of National Historic Significance.

See also
 James Eayrs

References

1895 births
1958 deaths
Alumni of the London School of Economics
Canadian political scientists
Dalhousie University alumni
Fellows of the Royal Society of Canada
Harvard University alumni
Persons of National Historic Significance (Canada)
People from Bridgewater, Nova Scotia
Rutgers University faculty
Academic staff of the University of Saskatchewan
Academic staff of the University of Toronto
Governor General's Award-winning non-fiction writers
Presidents of the Canadian Political Science Association
20th-century political scientists